Grupa 220 was a Yugoslav rock band from Zagreb founded in 1966. It was formed through merging previous instrumental rock groups Ehos and Jutarnje zvijezde. They are notable for publishing the first authored works in the local field of rock n' roll and the first hit in the genre, which made them popular across the country. They were one of the pioneers of Yugoslav rock music. They published their first EPs in 1967, "Osmijeh" and "Kad bih bio Petar Pan", with their first full album "Naši dani" releasing in 1968.

Discography

EP
 1967, Osmijeh (Jugoton)
 1967, Kad bih bio Petar Pan (Jugoton)

LP
 1968, Naši dani (Jugoton)
 1975, Slike (Suzy)

References

External links
Discogs
Enciklopedija.hr

Croatian rock music groups
Musical groups established in 1966
Instrumental rock musical groups
1966 establishments in Yugoslavia
1975 disestablishments in Yugoslavia
Musical groups disestablished in 1975